Mathias Nadeau (February 21, 1838 – February 6, 1919) was a farmer, merchant and political figure in New Brunswick, Canada. He represented Madawaska County in the Legislative Assembly of New Brunswick as a Conservative member from 1882 to 1886.

He was born in Saint-Hilaire, New Brunswick and educated at Sainte Anne's College. In 1862, he married Adelaide Saucier. Nadeau was a justice of the peace and served on the county council for six years. He was elected in an 1882 by-election held after P. Lynott resigned his seat.

References 
The Canadian parliamentary companion, 1883 JA Gemmill

1838 births
1919 deaths
Progressive Conservative Party of New Brunswick MLAs
Canadian justices of the peace